The Bishop Paiute Tribe, formerly known as the Paiute-Shoshone Indians of the Bishop Community of the Bishop Colony is a federally recognized tribe of Mono and Timbisha Indians of the Owens Valley, in Inyo County of eastern California. As of the 2010 Census the population was 1,588.

Reservation

The Bishop Paiute Tribe has a federal reservation, the Bishop Community of the Bishop Colony, in the upper Owens Valley, above the city of Bishop, California. Approximately 1,441 tribal members live on the reservation. The reservation was established in 1912. In 1990, 934 people were enrolled in the federally recognized tribe.
The reservation's current boundaries are the result of an Executive Order due to watershed acts during 1932 when President Hoover downsized the size of the grant from 67,000 acres to roughly 900 acres to enable the city of Los Angeles to pipe water from Bishop to Los Angeles County without negotiating a right-of-way with the Paiute.

The Bishop reservation also has their own casino (Wanaaha Casino, formerly known as Paiute Palace Casino), a health care system (Toiyabe Clinic), a student learning center (Barlow Gym), and even a gaming commission.

Government
The tribe is governed by a democratically elected tribal council. The current administration is as follows:
Council Chairman: Tilford P. Denver 
Vice Chair: Jeff Romero
Secretary: Steven Orihuela
Council Member: Allen Summers, Sr.
Council Member: Joyce White

The tribal council changes every 2 years. Sometimes there are 3 members who are appointed during odd numbers of the year. It is also co-ed. The tribal council has power to appoint authorities to certain members of the tribe to represent departments like TANF or Public Works. The tribal council has the power to remove members from departments and committees. They also have the power to make ordinances, policies, sanctions, and distribute land to its members.

Language
The Bishop Community traditionally spoke both the Timbisha language and Mono language, both of which are part of the Numic branch of the Uto-Aztecan language family. Timbisha is in the Central Numic and Mono is in the Western Numic divisions.

Today
The tribe's headquarters is located in Bishop, California. The tribe is governed by an elected five-member tribal council. With over 2000 enrolled members, the Bishop Community is the Fifth largest Native American tribe in California. The tribe has its own tribal court and many programs for its members. For economic development, the Bishop Community created the Paiute Palace Casino (now called Wanaaha Casino) and Tu-Kah Novie restaurant in Bishop.<ref>"Paiute Palace Casino Bishop." '100 Nations. (retrieved 8 Dec 2009)</ref>

Owens Valley Paiute Shoshone Cultural Center
The tribe operates the Owens Valley Paiute Shoshone Cultural Center located in Bishop, California. The center displays art and artifacts from area Paiute and Timbisha tribes and has an active repatriation program through NAGPRA. Their museum store sells contemporary beadwork, basketry, jewelry, quillwork, and educational materials.

Education
The colony is served by the Bishop Union Elementary School District and Bishop Joint Union High School District.

Notes

See also
 Mono traditional narratives
 Mono language (California)
 Timbisha language
 Population of Native California

References
 Pritzker, Barry M. A Native American Encyclopedia: History, Culture, and Peoples.'' Oxford: Oxford University Press, 2000. .

External links
 Bishop Paiute Tribe, official website
 Owens Valley Paiute Shoshone Cultural Center, museum website

 http://www.everyculture.com/multi/Le-Pa/Paiutes.html

Timbisha
Mono tribe
Northern Paiute
Native American tribes in California
Bishop, California
Inyo County, California
Owens Valley
Federally recognized tribes in the United States